Aetna is an unincorporated community in Craighead County, Arkansas, United States. It lies at an elevation of 266 feet (81 m).

References

Unincorporated communities in Craighead County, Arkansas
Unincorporated communities in Arkansas